Elephant Kraal of Ayutthaya, or Elephant Corral of Ayutthaya is a historic place in Ayutthaya Province, Thailand. It is considered part of the Ayutthaya Historical Park.

Description
The Elephant Kraal is known in Thai as Phaniat Khlong Chang. The first element phaniat (Thai: เพนียด) means 'a ground for capturing elephants', or 'elephant corrals', or 'working place for elephants and taking care of elephant corrals' in a broader sense; the second element khlong (Thai: คล้อง) means 'catching (for elephant only)'; the third element chang (Thai: ช้าง) means 'elephant', hence 'elephant kraal'.

In the Ayutthaya period, activities like catching elephants were regarded as festive events for the upper classes such as monarch or members of the royal family. The mahouts would herd elephants from the forest to the kraal (corral) then king chose the nice one and ordered court official to catch it. During capture, the mahout loops a lasso made of buffalo leather called a pakam under one of the back legs of the targeted elephant, and pulls with the help of a decoy elephant. These elephants were bred as steeds, used for ceremonies, and join the war. The kraal was built from logs lined up in the semicircle and split at the end of the line as the fence. These log fences with rounded heads resembling lotus buds are called in Thai as Sao Talung. Sao Talung is considered sacred. In the centre of the kraal is the shrine housing the idol of Ganesha, the elephant lord according to the belief in Brahmanism and local animism.

The last official capture of elephants in Thailand occurred in the reign of King Rama V to show the whole process of elephant catching to Czarevitch of Russia (later King Nicholas II of Russia), when he visited Siam (Thailand in those days) in 1893.

The kraal was first renovated in the reign of King Rama V for royal ceremony in 1911. 

Later, it was renovated in 1957. In 1962, the King Rama IX held an elephant catching perform to the King Frederick IX of Denmark on the occasion of his visit to Thailand.

The elephant kraal is now a recognised ancient monument since 1941 by the Fine Arts Department. 

In addition to being a place for raising the royal elephants, around the kraal is also the residence of the people who inherited the lineage from the royal elephant herders in the Ayutthaya court as well.

See also
Elephants in Thailand
Ayutthaya Historical Park

Notes

References

External links
Elephant Kraal Pavilion
	

Tourist attractions in Phra Nakhon Si Ayutthaya province
Buildings and structures in Phra Nakhon Si Ayutthaya province
Archaeological sites in Thailand
Registered ancient monuments in Thailand
Elephants in Thailand
Buildings and structures completed in the 16th century